Rasool Mohsin is an Iraqi Paralympic powerlifter. He represented Iraq at the Summer Paralympics in 2008, 2016 and 2021 and he won two medals: the silver medal in the men's 56 kg event in 2008 and the silver medal in the men's 72 kg event in 2016. He was also the flag bearer during the 2016 Summer Paralympics Parade of Nations. In 2021, he did not perform a successful lift in the men's 72 kg event at the 2020 Summer Paralympics in Tokyo, Japan.

In 2018, he won the gold medal in the men's 72 kg event at the Para Powerlifting Asia-Oceania Open Championships.

References

External links 
 

Living people
Year of birth missing (living people)
Place of birth missing (living people)
Powerlifters at the 2008 Summer Paralympics
Powerlifters at the 2016 Summer Paralympics
Powerlifters at the 2020 Summer Paralympics
Medalists at the 2008 Summer Paralympics
Medalists at the 2016 Summer Paralympics
Paralympic silver medalists for Iraq
Paralympic medalists in powerlifting
Paralympic powerlifters of Iraq